The Mirror Conspiracy is the second studio album by American electronic music duo Thievery Corporation, released in 2000 by ESL Music and 4AD. All the songs on the album were written, recorded and produced by Rob Garza and Eric Hilton, although Pam Bricker contributed vocals to "Air Batucada", "The Mirror Conspiracy" and "Lebanese Blonde".

The Mirror Conspiracy is the duo's best-selling album in the United States, selling over 224,000 units to date, according to Nielsen SoundScan.

Track listing 
"Treasures" – 2:24 (vocals by Brother Jack, percussion by Roberto Berimbao)
"Le Monde" – 3:11 (with LouLou Ghelichkhani) (vocals by LouLou Ghelichkhani, guitar by Chris Vreinos)
"Indra" – 5:22 
"Lebanese Blonde" – 4:48 (with Pam Bricker) (vocals by Pam Bricker, sitar by Rob Myers, horns by Rick Harris, percussion by Roberto Berimbao)
"Focus on Sight" – 3:47 (vocals by SEE-I, guitar and bass by Desmond Williams)
"Air Batucada" – 4:46 (with Pam Bricker) (vocals by Pam Bricker)
"Só com você" – 2:47 (with Bebel Gilberto) (vocals by Bebel Gilberto)
"Samba Tranquille" – 3:06
"Shadows of Ourselves" – 3:37 (with LouLou Ghelichkhani) (vocals by LouLou Ghelichkhani, guitar by Chris Vreinos, additional Keyboards by Desmond Williams, horns by Mike Thomas and Zack Grady)
"The Hong Kong Triad" – 3:01 (guitar by Chris Vreinos)
"Illumination" – 4:38
"The Mirror Conspiracy" – 3:45 (with Pam Bricker) (vocals by Pam Bricker, Percussion by Roberto Berimbao)
"Tomorrow" – 3:43
"Barrio Alto" – 3:54 (only available on 2000 reissue) (guitar by Ramon Gonzalez)
"A Guide for I and I" – 3:58 (only available on 2000 reissue) (vocals by Plejah)

Charts

Release history

References

2000 albums
Thievery Corporation albums